Jean-Baptiste Colbert (29 August 1619 – 6 September 1683) was a French statesman who served as First Minister of State from 1661 until his death in 1683 under the rule of King Louis XIV. His lasting impact on the organization of the country's politics and markets, known as Colbertism, a doctrine often characterized as a variant of mercantilism, earned him the nickname le Grand Colbert ("the Great Colbert").

A native of Reims, he was appointed Intendant of Finances on 4 May 1661. Colbert took over as Controller-General of Finances, a newly elevated position, in the aftermath of the arrest of Nicolas Fouquet for embezzlement, an event that led to the abolishment of the office of Superintendent of Finances. He worked to develop the domestic economy by raising tariffs and encouraging major public works projects, as well as to ensure that the French East India Company had access to foreign markets, so that they could always obtain coffee, cotton, dyewoods, fur, pepper, and sugar. He acted to create a favorable balance of trade and increase colonial holdings. As there was slavery in the colonies, in 1682, Colbert commissioned the beginning of a project that would become the Code Noir two years after his death in 1683. In addition, he founded France's merchant navy (marine marchande) becoming Secretary of State of the Navy in 1669.

His effective market reforms included the foundation of the Manufacture royale de glaces de miroirs in 1665 to supplant the importation of Venetian glass, which was forbidden in 1672 as soon as the national glass manufacturing industry was on sound footing. Also encouraging the technical expertise of Flemish cloth manufacturing in France, he founded royal tapestry works at Gobelins and supported those at Beauvais. He issued more than 150 edicts to regulate the guilds. The Académie des sciences was founded in 1666 at his suggestion; he was a member of the Académie française from 1 March 1667 to his death, where he occupied the 24th seat, to which Jean de La Fontaine would be elected after his passing. His son Jean-Baptiste Colbert, Marquis de Seignelay (1651–1690), succeeded him as Navy Secretary.

Biography

Early life
Colbert's father and grandfather were merchants in his birthplace of Reims, France. He claimed to have Scottish ancestry. A general (but unconfirmed) belief exists that he spent his early youth at a Jesuit  college, working for a Parisian banker; as well as working for the father of Jean Chapelain.

Before the age of 20, Colbert had a post in the war office, a position generally attributed to the marriage of an uncle to the sister of Secretary of War Michel le Tellier. Colbert spent some time as an inspector of troops, eventually becoming the personal secretary of Le Tellier. 
In 1647, through unknown means, Colbert acquired the confiscated goods of an uncle, Pussort.  In 1648, he and his wife Marie Charron, received 40,000 crowns from an unknown source; and in 1649 Colbert became the councilor of state, i.e. a political minister.

In 1657, he purchased the Barony of Seignelay.

Rise to power
Colbert was recommended to King Louis XIV by Mazarin.  While Cardinal Mazarin was in exile, Louis's trust in Colbert grew. In 1652 Colbert was asked to manage the affairs of the Cardinal while he was away. This new responsibility would detach Colbert from his other responsibility as commissaire des guerres. Although Colbert was not a supporter of Mazarin in principle, he would defend the cardinal's interests with unflagging devotion.

Colbert's earliest recorded attempt at tax reform came in the form of a mémoire to Mazarin, showing that of the taxes paid by the people, not one-half reached the King. The paper also contained an attack upon the Superintendent Fouquet. The postmaster of Paris, a spy of Fouquet's, read the letter, leading to a dispute which Mazarin attempted to suppress.

In 1661, Mazarin died and Colbert "made sure of the King's favor" by revealing the location of some of Mazarin's hidden wealth. In January 1664 Colbert became the Superintendent of buildings; in 1665 he became Controller-General of Finances; in 1669, he became Secretary of State of the Navy; he also gained appointments as minister of commerce, of the colonies and of the palace. In short, Colbert acquired power in every department except that of war.

A great financial and fiscal reform at once claimed all his energies. Not only the nobility, but many others who had no legal claim to exemption, paid no taxes; the bulk of the burden fell on the wretched country-folk. Supported by the young king Louis XIV, Colbert aimed the first blow at the man accused of being the greatest of the royal embezzlers, the superintendent Nicolas Fouquet. Fouquet's fall simultaneously secured Colbert's own advancement.

Economic reform

With the abolition of the office of superintendent and of many other offices dependent upon it, the supreme control of the finances became vested in a royal council. The sovereign functioned as its president; but Colbert, though for four years he possessed the title only of intendant, operated as its ruling spirit, having had great personal authority conferred upon him by the king.

His ruthlessness in this case, dangerous precedent though it gave, seemed perhaps necessary; the council could not respect individual interests. When he had severely punished guilty officials, he turned his attention to the fraudulent creditors of the government. Colbert had a simple method of operation. He repudiated some of the public loans and cut off from others a percentage, which varied, at first according to his own decision, and afterwards according to that of the council that he established to examine all claims against the state.

Much more serious difficulties met his attempts to introduce equality in the pressure of the taxes on the various classes. To diminish the number of the privileged proved impossible, but Colbert firmly resisted false claims for exemption, and lightened the unjust direct taxation by increasing the indirect taxes, from which the privileged could not escape. At the same time he immensely improved the mode of collection on his own.

His relentless hard work and thrift made him an esteemed minister. He achieved a reputation for his work of improving the state of French manufacturing and bringing the economy back from the brink of bankruptcy. Historians note that, despite Colbert's efforts, France actually became increasingly impoverished because of the King's excessive spending on wars.

Economic theory

Having thus introduced a measure of order and economy into the workings of the government, Colbert now called for the enrichment of the country by commerce. The state, through Colbert's dirigiste policies, fostered manufacturing enterprises in a wide variety of fields. The authorities established new industries, protected inventors, invited in workmen from foreign countries, and prohibited French workmen from emigrating.

To maintain the character of French goods in foreign markets, as well as to afford a guarantee to the home consumer, Colbert had the quality and measure of each article fixed by law, punishing breaches of the regulations by public exposure of the delinquent and by destruction of the goods concerned, and, on the third offense, by the pillory.  Colbert prohibited the production of qualities which would have suited many purposes of consumption, and the odious supervision which became necessary involved great waste of time and a stereotyped regularity which resisted all improvements. Other parts of Colbert's schemes have met with less equivocal condemnation.

By his firm maintenance of the corporation system, each industry remained in the hands of certain privileged bourgeois;  while the lower classes found opportunities of advancement closed.  He did, however, wisely consult the interests of internal commerce.

Unable to abolish the duties on the passage of goods from province to province, he did what he could to induce the provinces to equalize them. Currency exchange rates still remained between these provinces despite a policy focusing on the unification of French trade. His régime improved roads and canals. Pierre Paul Riquet (1604–1680) planned and constructed the Canal du Midi under Colbert's patronage.

To encourage overseas trade with the Levant, Senegal, Guinea and other places, Colbert granted privileges to companies, but, like the noted French East India Company, all proved unsuccessful.

Promoter of culture
Colbert took much interest in art and literature. He possessed a remarkably fine private library, which he delighted to fill with valuable manuscripts from every part of Europe and the Near East where France had placed a consul. He employed Pierre de Carcavi and Étienne Baluze as librarians. Colbert's grandson sold the manuscript collection in 1732 to the Bibliothèque Royale.

Colbert founded a number of institutions: 
 in 1663 the Academy of Inscriptions and Medals 
 in 1666 the Academy of Sciences (now part of the Institut de France) and the French Academy at Rome
 in 1667  the Paris Observatory, which he employed Claude Perrault to build and brought Giovanni Domenico Cassini (1625–1712) from Italy to superintend 
 in 1669 the Académie d'Opéra, later renamed the Académie Royale de Musique
 in 1671 the Academy of Architecture
 Academies at Arles, Soissons, Nîmes and many other towns

He reorganised the Academy of Painting and Sculpture which Mazarin had established. Wishing to increase the prestige of the image of France and the French royal family, Colbert played an active role in bringing the great Italian architect-sculptor, Gian Lorenzo Bernini, to Paris (June–October 1665), in order to design the new East Facade of the Louvre. This was a striking coup and caused a sensation because Bernini, the most famous artist in all of Europe, had never before (or after) consented to travel any significant distance to meet a patron, however highly ranked, but had to agree in this case for reasons of diplomacy between France and the Holy See. While in France, Bernini also sculpted a marble portrait bust of Louis XIV (Versailles palace). However the relations between the two strong-willed men, Colbert and Bernini, proved melodramatically stormy. Bernini's Louvre design was ultimately rejected.

Colbert himself became a member of the Académie française; and proposed one very characteristic rule with the intention of expediting the great Dictionary, in which he had a great interest: no one could count as present at any meeting unless he arrived before the hour of commencement and remained till the hour for leaving. In 1673 Colbert presided over the first exhibition of the works of living painters; and he enriched the Louvre with hundreds of pictures and statues.

He gave many pensions to men of letters, among whom we find Molière, Corneille, Racine, Boileau, P D Huet (1630–1721) and Antoine Varillas (1626–1696); and even foreigners, as Huygens, Carlo Roberto Dati the Dellacruscan. Evidence exists to show that by this munificence he hoped to draw out praises of his sovereign and himself; but this motive certainly does not account for all the splendid, if in some cases specious, services that he rendered to literature, science and art.

Death

Colbert worked incessantly hard until his final hours. Work was his religion; he once pondered whether it was better to rise early and work or retire very late and work. He concluded that rising early and retiring late would be the ideal combination. Towards the end of his life he suffered from stomach aches, which caused him much distress. He was reduced to eating moist bread dipped in chicken broth for his meals.

By 64 he was bedridden and died seven days after his birthday. The surgeons who examined him found that he had been suffering from kidney stones. A huge stone was found in his urinary tract, which would explain his pain.

Religion
 
Colbert played a subordinate role in the struggle between the king and the papacy as to the royal rights over vacant bishoprics, and he seems to have sympathised with the proposal that suggested seizing part of the wealth of the clergy. In his hatred of idleness he ventured to suppress no less than seventeen fêtes, and he had a project for reducing the number of persons devoted to clerical and monastic life, by increasing the age for taking the vows.

He showed himself at first unwilling to interfere with heresy, for he realised the commercial value of the Huguenots (French Protestants), who were well represented among the merchant classes; but when the king resolved to make all France Roman Catholic and revoked the Edict of Nantes,  he followed him and urged his subordinates to do all that they could to promote conversions.

Legacy

Colbert had nine children, including : 
Jeanne-Marie Colbert (1650-1732) , married Charles Honoré d'Albert, duc de Luynes
Jean-Baptiste Colbert, Marquis de Seignelay (1651-1690) , followed his father as Secretary of State of the Navy
Jacques-Nicolas Colbert (1654-1707) , Archbishop of Rouen.
Jean-Jules-Armand Colbert (1664-1704) , marquis de Blainville, killed at the Battle of Blenheim.
Henriette-Louise (1657-1733) , married Paul de Beauvilliers, 2nd duc de Saint-Aignan

His policies inspired those of Alexander Hamilton, the first treasury secretary of the United States.

Six ships of the French Navy bore his name:
 A steam corvette in 1848
 A battleship in 1875
 A cargo ship in 1914
 A dundee in 1916
 A French heavy cruiser, launched 1928
 A French missile cruiser, launched 1956

In literature, the power struggle between Colbert and Fouquet is one of the main plotlines of Alexandre Dumas, père's novel The Vicomte of Bragelonne, the second sequel to The Three Musketeers.  Dumas paints Colbert as an uncouth and ruthless schemer who stops at little, in contrast to the more refined Fouquet, counselled by Aramis, but also as a visionary patriot.

Colbert's statue stands outside the Assemblée nationale. It was vandalized in 2020 due to Colbert's part in drafting the Code noir.

Quotes
 "It is simply, and solely, the abundance of money within a state [which] makes the difference in its grandeur and power."
 "The art of taxation consists in so plucking the goose as to obtain the largest [number] of feathers with the least possible amount of hissing."

See also

French West India Company
Nicolas Fouquet

References

Sources
 Ames, Glenn J. Colbert, Mercantilism, and the French Quest for Asian Trade (1996)
 Clément, Jean-Pierre. Vie de Colbert, (Paris, 1846)
 Lettres, instructions, et Memoires de Colbert, (eight volumes, Paris, 1861–82)
 Histoire de Colbert et son administration, edited by Mademoiselle Clément, (Paris, 1874)
 Gordault, Colbert, ministre de Louis XIV, (Tours, 1885)
 Lavisse, Histoire de France, volume vii, part i, (Tours, 1905)
 Sargent, Economic Policy of Colbert, (London, 1899), which contains a bibliography of works relating to Colbert and his time.
 Tellier, Luc-Normand, Face aux Colbert : les Le Tellier, Vauban, Turgot ... et l'avènement du libéralisme, Presses de l'Université du Québec, 1987, 816 pages. 
Soll, Jacob The Information Master: Jean-Baptiste Colbert's Secret State Intelligence System; (University of Michigan Press 2009).

External links

Histoire de la vie et de l'administration de Colbert by Jean-Pierre Clément
Jean-Baptiste Colbert Correspondence Kislak Center for Special Collections, Rare Books and Manuscripts, University of Pennsylvania

 

French Ministers of Finance
French economists
French Roman Catholics
Government ministers of France
1619 births
1683 deaths
Politicians from Reims
Heads of the Bâtiments du Roi
Members of the Académie Française
Mercantilists
Burials at Saint-Eustache, Paris
Louis XIV
17th-century French politicians
Affair of the Poisons
17th-century French businesspeople
Court of Louis XIV